Ninalaid is a small Baltic Sea island  belonging to the country of Estonia.
 
Ninalaid lies just off the northwestern coast of the island of Hiiumaa, as such it is administered by Hiiu County. It lies closest to the Paope coastal area of the island near the small island of Külalaid.

See also
 List of islands of Estonia

References

External links
Tageo.com: Map of Ninalaid

Estonian islands in the Baltic
Hiiumaa Parish